The British half farthing was a denomination of sterling coinage worth  of a pound,  of a shilling, or  of a penny. It was minted in copper for use in Ceylon, but in 1842 was also declared legal tender in the United Kingdom. Two different obverses were used. Like all British coinage, it bore the portrait of the monarch on the obverse.

Before Decimal Day in 1971, sterling used the Carolingian monetary system, under which the largest unit was a pound divided into 20 shillings, each of 12 pence. Each penny was further divided into 4 farthings, thus a pound contained 1,920 half farthings and a shilling contained 96 half farthings.

History

The coin was initially produced in 1828 for use in Ceylon, and again in 1830. The obverse of the coin bears the left-facing portrait of King George IV, with the inscription GEORGIUS IV DEI GRATIA date while the reverse shows a seated Britannia with shield, facing right and holding a trident, with the inscription BRITANNIAR REX FID DEF. There was no indication of its value. The coin was made of copper, weighed 2.4 grams, and had a diameter of 18 millimetres.

In 1837, in the reign of King William IV, there was another issue, also of copper, 18 millimetres in diameter, but only weighing 2.3 grams. The obverse of this coin bears the right-facing portrait of William IV with the inscription GULIELMUS IIII DEI GRATIA 1837, and the same reverse as before.

In the reign of Queen Victoria, coins were minted for circulation in 1839, 1842, 1843, 1844, 1847, 1851, 1852, 1853, 1854, and 1856. Again they were made of copper, 18 millimetres in diameter, and weighed 2.4 grams (except for 1856, which was 2.3 grams). The design changed considerably from what went before—the obverse bears the left-facing portrait of Queen Victoria, with the inscription VICTORIA D G BRITANNIAR REGINA F D , while the reverse bears a crown above the words HALF FARTHING with (1839) a rose with three leaves at the bottom of the coin, or (1842 and later) a rose, thistle, and shamrock.

The change in design was because the coin was additionally made legal tender in the United Kingdom from 13 June 1842. There was much cynicism of the need for such a coin in Britain, with letters written to The Times, but the coin did indeed circulate widely in Britain and Ceylon.

The purchasing value of a penny in 1844, at 2013 purchasing power, was (at its lowest) 35p sterling. A half-farthing, therefore (one eighth of a penny) would have had a value in 2013 of  4.375p (pence sterling). Yet, as of 2014, the UK still had widely circulating coins of just 1p and 2p. The half-farthing therefore was not of so minuscule a value as (middle-class) writers of the day (1844) might imagine. Unadjusted for inflation, its conversion to modern denominations would place it at slightly more than one twentieth of a decimal penny.

The entire issue was demonetised from 1 January 1870.

References

History of British coinage
Half Farthing
Coins of Sri Lanka